Engan  is a village in the Thiruvarur taluk of Thiruvarur district in Tamil Nadu, India. The Engan Murugan Temple, a popular Hindu shrine is located here.

Demographics 

As per the 2001 census, Engan had a population of 2,724 with 1,359 males and 1,365 females. The sex ratio was 1004. The literacy rate was 67.34.

References 

 

Villages in Tiruvarur district